Luigi Ambrosio (born 27 January 1963) is a professor at Scuola Normale Superiore in Pisa, Italy. His main fields of research are the calculus of variations and geometric measure theory.

Biography
Ambrosio entered the Scuola Normale Superiore di Pisa in 1981. He obtained his degree under the guidance of Ennio de Giorgi in 1985 at University of Pisa, and the Diploma at Scuola Normale. He obtained his PhD in 1988.

He is currently professor at the Scuola Normale, having taught previously at the University of Rome "Tor Vergata", the University of Pisa, and the University of Pavia. Ambrosio also taught and conducted research at the Massachusetts Institute of Technology, the ETH in Zurich, and the Max Planck Institute for Mathematics in the Sciences in Leipzig.

He is the Managing Editor of the scientific journal Calculus of Variations and Partial Differential Equations, and member of the editorial boards of scientific journals.

Since May 9, 2019 Ambrosio is the director of the Scuola Normale Superiore di Pisa.

Awards
In 1998 Ambrosio won the Caccioppoli Prize of the Italian Mathematical Union. In 2002 he was invited speaker at the International Congress of Mathematicians in Beijing and in 2003 he has been awarded with the Fermat Prize. From 2005 he is a corresponding member of Accademia Nazionale dei Lincei. Ambrosio is listed as an ISI highly cited researcher. In 2018 he was a plenary speaker at the International Congress of Mathematicians in Rio de Janeiro. In 2019 he received the Balzan Prize in Mathematics (Theory of Partial Differential Equations).

Selected publications

References

External links
Site of Caccioppoli Prize 

20th-century Italian mathematicians
21st-century Italian mathematicians
Living people
1963 births
People from Alba, Piedmont
Variational analysts
Academic staff of the Scuola Normale Superiore di Pisa